Phi Kappa Pi is a Canadian national fraternity. There are alumni chapters associated with most undergraduate locations, as well as a National Council. The fraternity operates as a social one on all of the campuses upon which it resides.

History

Phi Kappa Pi Fraternity was founded in 1913, by two previously existing and separate organizations. Sigma Pi, founded in Toronto in 1901 and Alpha Beta Gamma, founded in Montreal in 1905, joined forces to create Canada's first and only national fraternity. The individual organizations' names would then become chapter names.

In 1923, alumni from the Alpha Beta Gamma chapter approached the Phi Kappa Pi National Council about the possibility of expanding to Dalhousie University in Halifax, Nova Scotia. The expansion request was approved and a chapter was founded. The chapter was the first fraternity to be located on Dalhousie's campus, and was named the Dalhousie chapter until 1959 when it received its Greek name, Zeta Gamma. The following year, 1924, Alpha Iota chapter was established at the University of British Columbia, followed by Delta Mu chapter in 1930 at the University of Alberta, Tau Sigma Rho chapter in 1935 at the University of Manitoba, and Alpha Epsilon chapter in 1967 at the University of Waterloo.

The 1970s proved to be a tough decade for Phi Kappa Pi, with 4 chapters being lost. Alpha Iota and Alpha Epsilon both closed down in 1974, followed by Tau Sigma Rho in 1975, and one of the founding chapters, Alpha Beta Gamma in 1976. Alpha Beta Gamma, however, would be reopened in 1990 with the help of alumni from Phi Kappa Pi's then remaining two chapters. Soon after, in 2000, Theta Kappa Omicron chapter opened at the University of Ottawa, and Omega Iota opened in 2006 at the University of Ontario Institute of Technology.

In September 2008, Simon Fraser University's student body voted 57% in favour of overturning the university's ban of Greek life on campus. The Omega Epsilon chapter opened on the university's campus in 2012. Phi Kappa Pi was the first Greek life organization to open on the Simon Fraser campus. Despite its establishment, the Omega Epsilon chapter has yet to be officially recognized by the university. Lack of institutional recognition is common across the Canadian fraternity system. Nevertheless, the Simon Fraser chapter continues to operate on and off campus as it tries to help convey a social life within the university's community.

Chapters
Until at least 1976, the chapter names are the name of the local from which it was formed, except in the case of Dalhousie.

Notable alumni

See also
List of fraternities and sororities at Dalhousie University
Fraternities and sororities in Canada

References 

Fraternities and sororities in Canada
1913 establishments in Canada
Student organizations established in 1913